Rudolstadt (Thür) station is a railway station in the municipality of Rudolstadt, located in the Saalfeld-Rudolstadt district in Thuringia, Germany.

References

Railway stations in Thuringia
Buildings and structures in Saalfeld-Rudolstadt
Railway stations in Germany opened in 1874